The 2001 WNBA season was the fifth season for the Los Angeles Sparks. The Sparks won their first WNBA Finals.

Offseason

WNBA Draft

Regular season

Season standings

Season Schedule

Playoffs

Player stats

Awards and honors
Lisa Leslie, WNBA Finals MVP Award
Lisa Leslie, WNBA Most Valuable Player Award
Latasha Byears, WNBA Peak Performer

References

Los Angeles Sparks seasons
Los Angeles
Women's National Basketball Association championship seasons
Western Conference (WNBA) championship seasons
Los Angeles Sparks